Bryn Euryn is a hill which is a Site of Special Scientific Interest in Conwy County Borough, Wales. There is a trig point at the summit. It lies above the seaside town of Rhos-on-Sea and village of Mochdre, Conwy. It is 131 metres (430 feet) above sea level, and is listed as a HuMP.
At the bottom of the hill are the remains of Llys Euryn.

Dinerth
The site commands extensive views of the Conwy Valley and coast, and was once the location of a hillfort, which was initially excavated in the autumn of 1997 for the Gwynedd Archaeological Trust. There were no archaeological discoveries permitting a certain identification, but the pre-Norman layout led David Longley, the study's director, to connect it with the early-6th century king of Rhos Cynlas the Red on the basis of the "Bear Den" mentioned in Gildas's passage on him and the surviving local name of the area as Dinerth ("Fort Bear").

The hilltop was used again in World War II first as an observation post by the Home Guard; it was then used by the RAF as one of the first radar posts used to detect German bombers heading to Liverpool.

See also
List of Sites of Special Scientific Interest in Clwyd
List of hillforts in Wales

References

1997 archaeological discoveries
Rhos-on-Sea
Hillforts in Conwy County Borough
Mountains and hills of Conwy County Borough
Sites of Special Scientific Interest in Clwyd